Karl Ruben Allinger (23 December 1891 in Uppsala, Sweden – 9 January 1979) was a Swedish ice hockey player who competed in the 1924 Winter Olympics.

In 1924 he was a member of the Swedish ice hockey team which finished fourth in the Olympic ice hockey tournament.

Allinger was part of the Djurgården Swedish champions' team of 1926.

References

External links

profile

1891 births
1979 deaths
Ice hockey players at the 1924 Winter Olympics
Olympic ice hockey players of Sweden
Sportspeople from Uppsala